Simeon Vergnol (18 February 1898 – 8 August 1966) was a French racing cyclist. He rode in the 1925 Tour de France.

References

1898 births
1966 deaths
French male cyclists
Place of birth missing